Keeranur is a panchayat town in Pudukkottai District in the Indian state of Tamil Nadu. It is located 225 km South-East of Coimbatore. The Uthama Nathaswami Sivan Temple is of a Mutharaya edifice and contains epigraphs of Cholas and Vijayanagar Empires.

Demographics
 India census, Keeranur had a population of 9681. Males constitute 51% of the population and females 49%. Keeranur has an average literacy rate of 76%, higher than the national average of 59.5%: male literacy is 82%, and female literacy is 70%. In Keeranur, 12% of the population is under 7 years of age.

References

Cities and towns in Pudukkottai district